Ashley Hartog (born 1 September 1982, in Cape Town, Western Cape) is a South African football (soccer) striker who last played for Engen Santos.

Club career

FC Fortune
Hartog began his career with FC Fortune, later known as Western Province United.

Loan to Sint-Truidense
In 2007, he was loaned to Jupiler League club Sint-Truidense, where he played five games, scoring one goal.

FC Cape Town
After one year in Belgium he returned to South Africa, where he played for FC Cape Town.

SuperSport United
In early 2011 Hartog joined SuperSport United on loan. The move was later made permanent.

Maritzburg United
In 2013 Hartog joined Maritzburg United on a two-year deal. On 29 January 2016 he was released by Maritzburg United, following a falling out with manager Ernst Middendorp on disciplinary grounds together with team-mate John Paintsil.

Ajax Cape Town
On 18 February 2016, Hartog signed a short-term contract with Ajax Cape Town. 3 months later he was released by Ajax Cape Town.

References

External links

1982 births
South African soccer players
Living people
Sportspeople from Cape Town
Association football forwards
Sint-Truidense V.V. players
Cape Coloureds
F.C. Cape Town players
SuperSport United F.C. players
Maritzburg United F.C. players